The Professional Social Workers' Association (PSWA) is an association of Indian / Tamil Nadu social work professionals, headquartered at Chennai. It is a legally registered entity, formerly known as "Professional Social Workers' Forum" (PSWF). The Association is functioning since 1985.

Objectives
They are also organizing an annual state level seminar pertaining to current social work challenges and practices. International Social Workers' Day is an annual event of PSWA.

References

External links
Official homepage

Professional associations based in India
Indian social workers
Organizations established in 1985
1985 establishments in Tamil Nadu
Organisations based in Tamil Nadu